Andrea Pazzagli (18 January 1960 – 31 July 2011) was an Italian footballer who played as a goalkeeper, most notably for A.C. Milan in the late 1980s and early 1990s.

Career
Throughout his career, Pazzagli played for Imola (1978–1979), Bologna (1979–1980; 1982–1983; 1991–1993),
Udinese (1980–1981), Catania (1981–1982), Rondinella (1983–1984), Perugia (1984–1986), Ascoli (1986–1989), Milan (1989–1991), Roma (1993–1994), and Prato (1994–1996). With Milan, although he was initially a back-up keeper behind Giovanni Galli, he later broke into the starting line-up under manager Arrigo Sacchi, featuring in Milan's 1990 Intercontinental Cup and 1990 European Super Cup victories, after having previously been left on the bench for the 1989 UEFA Super Cup and the 1989 Intercontinental Cup final victories the previous season, also winning the 1989–90 European Cup during his time with the club.

After retirement
After retiring, he became a goalkeeping coach; after working for A.C. Milan and Fiorentina, in 2011 he joined the Italian national team coaching staff.

Pazzagli died of a heart attack on 31 July 2011 whilst on holiday in Punta Ala, Tuscany.

Pazzagli's son Edoardo followed in his footsteps and also became a goalkeeper.

Honours
Ascoli
 Mitropa Cup: 1986–87

Milan
 UEFA Champions League: 1989–90
 UEFA Super Cup: 1989, 1990
 Intercontinental Cup: 1989, 1990

References

1960 births
2011 deaths
Italian footballers
Association football goalkeepers
Bologna F.C. 1909 players
Udinese Calcio players
Catania S.S.D. players
A.C. Perugia Calcio players
Ascoli Calcio 1898 F.C. players
A.C. Milan players
A.S. Roma players
A.C. Prato players
Serie A players
Serie B players
Imolese Calcio 1919 players